Mehmet Ömer Arif Aras (born November 8, 1954, in Istanbul) is a Turkish banker and chairman of the board of  QNB Finansbank

Early life
Ömer Aras completed his primary, secondary and high school education at Şişli Terakki High School in 1971. He graduated from the Academy of Economic and Commercial Sciences, College of Economy and Finance in 1975, and received an MBA in 1978 and PhD in 1981 from Syracuse University in New York, U.S.
He worked as an assistant professor at the Ohio State University Business Administration Department from 1982 to 1984 and returned to Turkey in 1984.
He got married with Feyza Aras in 1980. Aras has two children.

Career
He started his career as a junior credit marketing manager at Citibank Istanbul in 1984. In 1987, when he was working as a credit marketing manager and credit committee member, he quit his job to work for Yapi Kredi as head of Securities.

He co-founded Finansbank with Hüsnü Özyeğin in 1987. He worked as assistant general manager responsible for credit marketing, treasury and foreign affairs from 1987 to 1989 and became general manager in 1989. He served as general manager from 1989 to 1995 and as an executive board member at QNB Finansbank.

Aras worked as the vice chairman of the board at Fiba Holding from 1995 to 2006 and member of the board of directors at Finansbank's affiliates in Switzerland, the Netherlands, Russia, Romania and France.

He also served as the chairman of the board at Marks & Spencer Turkey and member of the board at Gima, which are Fiba Holding's retail industry investments.

Upon acquisition of Finansbank A.Ş by National Bank of Greece from Fiba Group in 2006, he first worked as vice chairman and then chairman of the board in 2010, also serving as group CEO responsible for management of QNB Finansbank and its affiliates.

In 2007, he acted as chairman of the board at Cigna Finans Retirement, formerly known as Finans Emeklilik, 51% of which was purchased by American Cigna in 2012.

He was elected to serve as the executive committee member responsible for affiliates in Southeastern Europe at National Bank of Greece in 2008. He assumed management of banks operating in Bulgaria, Romania, Serbia, North Macedonia and Albania.

He worked as a member of the board at the Turkish Industry & Business Association (TÜSİAD) from 2003 to 2006. In 2015, he was elected as vice president of the High Advisory Council.

He participated in the founding of Özyeğin University in 2007 and has been a member of the board of trustees since then.
In 2016 June, Finansbak A.Ş was acquired by Qatar National Bank (QNB) and The bank's name has been changed to QNB Finansbank. Aras, is still the chairman of QNB Finansbank.

Affiliations
 TÜSİAD – vice president of the High Advisory Council
 Darüşşafaka Society – High Advisory Board
 Özyeğin University – board of trustees
 Hüsnü Özyeğin Foundation – board of trustees
 Mother Child Education Foundation – board of trustees
 Galata Business Angels
 Tennis, Fencing and Mountain Climbing Sports Club
 Galatasaray Sports Club

Publications
 Turkish Policy Quarterly, September 2014
 International Journal of Policy and Information, December 15, 1985
 IIE Transactions, Volume 17, Number 3, September 1985
 TIMS XXVI Copenhagen, Denmark, June 17, 1984
 American Institute of Decision Sciences, San Francisco, November 22, 1982
 Journal of Operations Management, May 1982
 American Institute for Decision Sciences, Boston, November 18, 1981
 American Institute of Decision Sciences, Las Vegas, November 5, 1980

See also
 QNB Finansbank
 Fiba Holding
 Özyeğin University
 National Bank of Greece
 Qatar National Bank

References

1954 births
Living people
Turkish bankers